Rudnica is a village in the municipality of Raška, Serbia.

Demographics
According to the 2011 census, the village had a population of 332 people. According to the 2002 census, the village had a population of 300 people, 99% of whom were ethnic Serbs.

Mass grave
In May 2010 and December 2013, human remains were excavated from a mass grave, allegedly belonging to an estimated 250 Kosovo Albanians killed in the Kosovo War (1998–99).

References

Populated places in Raška District